The Last of the International Playboys is the sixth full-length studio album from San Francisco-based alternative rock band Stroke 9. It was released on June 5, 2007.

The album was the band's first in which bass player Jens Funke contributed to the songwriting.

Track listing
 "It's Curtains For You!"
 "7-Year Itch"
 "The Yeah Song"
 "Feel The Summer"
 "Salutations"
 "Scream"
 "So Good"
 "Who I Am"
 "Duality Of Man"
 "The One"
 "Last Of The International Playboys"

See also
 "The Last of the Famous International Playboys", a 1989 song by British solo artist Morrissey.

References

Stroke 9 albums
2007 albums